DYRG (1251 AM) Radyo Budyong is a radio station owned and operated by Intercontinental Broadcasting Corporation. Its studio is located at ACP Bldg., Roxas Avenue Ext., Brgy. Andagao Kalibo.

References

Radio stations in Aklan
Radio stations established in 1981
Intercontinental Broadcasting Corporation
IBC News and Public Affairs
News and talk radio stations in the Philippines